Agialexiotissa is a neighbourhood in the city of Patras, Achaea, Greece. "Αγιαλεξιώτισσα" is a local naming/adjective identification of Virgin Mary.

Neighborhoods in Patras